The Freshman is a 1925 American silent comedy film that tells the story of a college freshman trying to become popular by joining the school football team.  It stars Harold Lloyd, Jobyna Ralston, Brooks Benedict, and James Anderson.  It remains one of Lloyd's most successful and enduring films.

The film was written by John Grey, Sam Taylor, Tim Whelan, and Ted Wilde.  It was directed by Taylor and Fred C. Newmeyer.

In 1990, The Freshman was selected for preservation in the United States National Film Registry by the Library of Congress as being "culturally, historically, or aesthetically significant", added in the second year of voting and one of the first 50 films to receive the honor.

Plot

Harold Lamb (Harold Lloyd), a bright-eyed but naive young man, enrolls at Tate University. On the train there, he meets Peggy (Jobyna Ralston). They are attracted to each other.

Harold decides that the best way to ensure his popularity at school is to emulate his movie idol, The College Hero, down to mimicking a little jig he does before greeting anyone, and taking his nickname, "Speedy". However, the College Cad (Brooks Benedict) quickly makes him the butt of an ongoing joke, of which the freshman remains blissfully unaware. Harold thinks he is popular, when in fact he is the laughingstock of the whole school. His only real friend is Peggy, who turns out to be his landlady's daughter.  She is described in one of the film's title cards as "the kind of girl your mother must have been".

He tries out for the football team. The coach (Pat Harmon) is unimpressed, but as Harold has damaged their only practice tackle dummy, the coach uses him in its place. At the end of practice, though, he approves of Harold's enthusiasm (undiminished after repeated tackling). The coach is about to dismiss the freshman when Chet Trask (James Anderson), the captain and star of the team, suggests making him their water boy, while letting him think he has made the squad.

Harold is persuaded to host the annual "Fall Frolic" dance. His tailor is late making his suit; with the dance well underway, it is barely being held together by basting stitches, but Harold puts it on and hopes for the best. During the party, his clothes start to fall apart, despite the efforts of the tailor (hiding in a side room) to effect repairs. When Harold sees the College Cad being too forward with Peggy, working as a hatcheck girl, Harold knocks him down. The incensed Cad then tells him just what everyone really thinks of him. Peggy advises him to stop putting on an act and be himself.

Harold is determined to prove himself by getting into the big football game.  His chance comes when the other team proves too tough, injuring so many of Tate College's players that the coach runs out of substitutes. Hounded by Harold and warned by the referee that he will forfeit if he cannot come up with another player, the coach reluctantly lets Harold go in. The first few plays are disastrous. Finally, he breaks free and is on his way to winning the game, but, mindful of a referee's prior instruction that he is to stop playing when he hears the whistle, he drops the football just outside the end zone when a non-football whistle sounds. The other team recovers the ball with only a minute left to play. His teammates are disheartened, but Harold rouses them to make a final effort. He chases down the opposing ball carrier, knocks the football loose, scoops it up and runs it all the way back for the winning touchdown as time runs out, which at last earns him the respect and popularity he was after. To top it off, Peggy passes him a note proclaiming her love for him.

Cast

Harold Lloyd as The Freshman
Jobyna Ralston as Peggy
Brooks Benedict as The College Cad
James Anderson as The College Hero
Hazel Keener as The College Belle
Joseph Harrington as The College Tailor
Pat Harmon as The Football Coach

Pete the Pup has a cameo in the movie.

Production

Train station scenes were filmed on November 12–13, 1924 at the Southern Pacific Railroad depot at Ontario, California, with a four-car train set and locomotive provided by the railroad and standing on a siding adjacent to the station. Some shots were also made in the park across the street from the depot. Some 80 cast and crew were involved at this location. Reverse angle reaction shots of the college dean were later done at the Culver City Pacific Electric depot near the film studio.

Exteriors were filmed near the USC campus in Los Angeles.  The game sequence was shot on the field at the Rose Bowl, and the crowd scenes were shot at halftime at California Memorial Stadium during the November 1924 Big Game between UC Berkeley and Stanford University.

Reception

The Freshman is widely considered one of Lloyd's most hilarious, well-constructed films and was his most successful silent film of the 1920s. Hugely popular at the time of its release, it sparked a craze for college films that lasted well beyond the 1920s. It was one of Lloyd's few films to remain widely available after the sound era, and he reissued the film (with cuts) and used extended scenes in compilation films of the 1960s. The football game sequence was reused by Lloyd and director Preston Sturges in Lloyd's last film, The Sin of Harold Diddlebock (1947).

The film is recognized by American Film Institute in these lists:
 2000: AFI's 100 Years...100 Laughs – #79

Copyright lawsuits 
American humorist and author H. C. Witwer sued Lloyd in April 1929 for $2,300,000 over The Freshman, claiming that it was "pirated" from Witwer's short story "The Emancipation of Rodney", first published in 1915. When Witwer died from liver failure in Los Angeles, on August 9, 1929, the lawsuit had not been settled. Witwer's widow pursued the lawsuit and won a judgment against Lloyd in November 1930. On appeal, the United States Court of Appeals overturned the ruling and Witwer's widow received nothing.

A further lawsuit was brought in 2000 by Lloyd's granddaughter, Suzanne Lloyd Hayes, against the Walt Disney Company, alleging that elements of The Freshman were copied to the 1998 comedy The Waterboy; the US District Court in Los Angeles eventually ruled against Hayes.

Home media
Criterion released The Freshman on Blu-ray and DVD on March 25, 2014.

See also
 Harold Lloyd filmography
 The Sin of Harold Diddlebock

References

External links

The Freshman essay by Annette D'Agostino Lloyd at National Film Registry 
The Freshman essay by Daniel Eagan in America's Film Legacy: The Authoritative Guide to the Landmark Movies in the National Film Registry, A&C Black, 2010 , pages 101-103 

The Freshman: Speedy Saves the Day! A Harold Lamb Adventure! an essay by Stephen Winer at the Criterion Collection

1925 films
American silent feature films
American football films
American black-and-white films
Films directed by Fred C. Newmeyer
Films directed by Sam Taylor
Films set in universities and colleges
American sports comedy films
United States National Film Registry films
Films with screenplays by Sam Taylor (director)
Films with screenplays by John Grey
1920s sports comedy films
Surviving American silent films
1925 comedy films
1920s American films
Silent American comedy films
1920s English-language films
Silent sports comedy films